Beled is a town in Győr-Moson-Sopron county, Hungary with a population of around 2.5k people.

References

External links

  in Hungarian
 Street map

External links

Official data for Beled

Populated places in Győr-Moson-Sopron County